Oscilla tricordata is a species of sea snail, a marine gastropod mollusk in the family Pyramidellidae, the pyrams and their allies.

Distribution
This marine species occurs off Japan and Korea

References

 Higo, S., Callomon, P. & Goto, Y. (1999). Catalogue and bibliography of the marine shell-bearing Mollusca of Japan. Osaka. : Elle Scientific Publications. 749 pp.
  Ronald G. Noseworthy, Na-Rae Lim, and Kwang-Sik Choi, A Catalogue of the Mollusks of Jeju Island, South Korea; Korean Journal of Malacology, Vol. 23(1): 65-104, June 30, 2007

External links
 To World Register of Marine Species

Pyramidellidae
Gastropods described in 1938